Proto-Mayan is the hypothetical common ancestor of the 30 living Mayan languages, as well as the Classic Maya language documented in the Maya inscriptions. While there has been some controversy with Mayan subgrouping, there has been a general agreement that the following are the main five subgroups of the family: Huastecan, Yucatecan, Cholan-Tzeltalan, Kanjobalan-Chujean, and Quichean-Mamean.

Phonology
The Proto-Mayan language is reconstructed (Campbell and Kaufman 1985) as having the following sounds:

Five vowels: a, e, i, o and u.
Each of these occurring as short and long: aa, ee, ii, oo and uu,

Sound rules
The following set of sound changes from proto-Mayan to the modern languages are used as the basis of the classification of the Mayan languages. Each sound change may be shared by a number of languages; a grey background indicates no change.

Developments

Instead they are reflected differently in different branches allowing a reconstruction of these phonemes as palatalized plosives.

The changes of Proto-Mayan glottal fricative  are many and it has different reflexes according to position. In some positions it has added length to the preceding vowel in languages that preserve a length distinction.

Only Kʼichean–Mamean and some Qʼanjobʼalan languages have retained Proto-Mayan uvular stops  and  whereas all other branches have changed these into  and  respectively.

In Mamean a chain shift took place changing  into ,  into ,  into  and  into . These retroflex affricates and fricatives later diffused into Qʼanjobʼalan.

In polysyllabic words Kaqchikel and Tzʼutujil have changed a final Proto-Mayan  and  into  and  respectively.

Huastecan is the only branch to have changed Proto-Mayan  into . Wastek also is the only Mayan language to have a phonemic labialized velar phoneme , but this is known to be a postcolonial development. For example, the word for "vulture" which in modern Wastek is pronounced  was written   <cuyx> in colonial Wastek and pronounced .

The Yucatecan languages have all shifted Proto-Mayan  into  in wordfinal position.

Several languages particularly Cholan and Yucatecan have changed short  into .

All Cholan languages have changed long proto-Mayan vowels  and  into  and  respectively.

Vowel length distinction has been lost in Qʼanjobʼalan-Chujean (except for Mochoʼ and Akateko), Kaqchikel and Cholan. Some languages have reduced the vowel length distinction into a tense lax distinction that was later lost for most vowels, Kaqchikel however retains a centralized lax schwa-like vowel as a reflex of Proto-Mayan .

References

Sources 
 England, Nora C., 1994, Autonomia de los Idiomas Mayas: Historia e identidad. (Ukutaʼmil Ramaqʼiil Utzijobʼaal ri Mayaʼ Amaaqʼ.) Cholsamaj. Guatemala.
 Handbook of Middle American Indians, 1967, 1969, R. Wauchope (series ed.).  Vol 7 (ethnographic sketches of Mayan groups), Volume 5 (linguistic sketches and other useful materials). F 1434, H 3, LAC (ref).
 Lyle Campbell and Terrence Kaufman, Annual Review of Anthropology. 1985. "Mayan Linguistics: Where are We Now?"

External links

The Guatemalan Academy of Mayan Languages - Spanish/Mayan site, the primary authority on Mayan Languages
Yucatec - English Dictionary
 Bibliography of Maya related topics from the University of Texas Anthropology website
The Mayan Languages- A Comparative Vocabulary contains more than 40,000 entries for 31 Mayan languages
English Words and their Classic Maya Equivalents
Ethnologue Mayan language family tree

 
Mayan